Stephanie Aeffner (born 29 April 1976) is a German politician from Alliance 90/The Greens who has been serving as a Member of the German Bundestag since 2021.

Early life 
Aeffner hails from Frankfurt.

Medical career 
In 2000 Aeffner began studying social pedagogy at the Heidelberg University of Applied Sciences, which she completed in 2006 as a qualified social worker. After working as a temporary worker in outpatient nursing, she worked from 2006 to 2009 as a quality manager in the Clinic for Surgery at the University Hospital Mannheim.

Political career 
In the 2021 German federal election, Aeffner contested Pforzheim. She came in fourth place, but was elected to the Bundestag on the state list. In the negotiations to form a so-called traffic light coalition of the Social Democratic Party (SPD), the Green Party and the Free Democratic Party (FDP), she was part of her party's delegation in the working group on social policy, co-chaired by Dagmar Schmidt, Sven Lehmann and Johannes Vogel.

In parliament, Aeffner has since been serving on the Committee on Labour and Social Affairs and the Parliamentary Advisory Board on Sustainable Development.

Personal life 
Aeffner has been dependent on a wheelchair since 1999.

References 

Living people
1976 births
Members of the Bundestag for Alliance 90/The Greens
Members of the Bundestag for Baden-Württemberg
Members of the Bundestag 2021–2025
Wheelchair users
21st-century German politicians
21st-century German women politicians
Female members of the Bundestag
German nurses
German social workers